The Happiness of Having You is the twenty-first studio album by American country music artist Charley Pride. It was released in November 1975 via RCA Victor Records and was produced by Jerry Bradley. It was Pride's twenty first studio recording released in his music career and contained ten tracks. The album included two singles which became major hits on the country charts: "My Eyes Can Only See as Far as You" and the title track.

Background and content
Charley Pride had nearly a decade of country music success by 1975. This included a string of number one hits during this period, including "It's Gonna Take a Little Bit Longer", "She's Too Good to Be True" and "A Shoulder to Cry On". As the decade progressed, his music took a more country pop style, which included this album. The Happiness of Having You was recorded at the RCA Victor Studio in August 1975. The sessions were produced by Jerry Bradley. The record consisted of ten tracks. Most of the album's material was new music composed by songwriters such as Johnny Duncan, Ben Peters and Kenny O'Dell. Also included on the LP was a cover of Kris Kristofferson's "Help Me Make It Through the Night".

Release and chart performance
The Happiness of Having You was released in November 1975 via RCA Victor Records. The project marked Pride's twenty first studio album. It was also Pride's second studio album released in 1975. The project was originally distributed as a vinyl LP, containing five songs on both sides of the record. It was also simultaneously issued as a cassette with a nearly identical track listing. In later years it would issued digitally for music downloads and for streaming purposes, including Apple Music. The Happiness of Having You spent a total of 22 weeks on the Billboard Top Country Albums chart. In February 1976, it peaked at number two on the chart. The album's title track was released as the lead single in November 1975. It became a major country hit after peaking at number three on the Billboard Hot Country Songs chart in January 1976. "My Eyes Can Only See as Far as You" was spawned as the album's second single in February 1976. Spending 14 weeks on the same chart, it peaked at number one in May 1976. Both singles would also reach number one on the RPM Country Singles chart in Canada.

Track listings

Vinyl version

Cassette version

Digital version

Personnel
All credits are adapted from the liner notes of The Happiness of Having You.

Musical personnel

 Hayward Bishop – drums
 Harold Bradley – guitar
 David Briggs – piano
 Pete Drake – steel guitar
 Johnny Gimble – fiddle
 The Jordanaires – background vocals
 The Sheldon Kurland Strings – string instruments
 Mike Leach – bass
 Charlie McCoy – harmonica
 The Nashville Edition – background vocals
 Charley Pride – lead vocals
 Hal Rugg – steel guitar
 Dale Sellers – guitar
 Bobby Thompson – banjo
 Pete Wade – guitar
 Tommy Williams – fiddle
 Chip Young – guitar
 Reggie Young – guitar

Technical personnel
 Jerry Bradley – producer
 Herb Burnette – art direction
 John Donegan – photography
 Bill Harris – recording engineer
 Al Pachucki – recording engineer
 Tom Pick – recording engineer
 David Roys – recording technician
 Chuck Seitz – recording technician
 Mike Shockley – recording technician
 Roy Shockley – recording technician
 Pinwheel Studios – art direction
 Bill Vandevort – recording engineer

Chart performance

Release history

References

1975 albums
Albums produced by Jerry Bradley (music executive)
Albums produced by Charley Pride
Charley Pride albums
RCA Victor albums